María de los Remedios Alicia Rodriga Varo y Uranga (known as Remedios Varo, 16 December 1908 – 8 October 1963) was a Spanish-born Mexican surrealist painter working in Spain, France, and Mexico.

Varos had a difficult life, struggling against poverty and fleeing from war in Spain and then France. In the last thirteen years of her life she found financial stability in Mexico, painting productively until her sudden death in 1963.

Early life and education (1908-1930)
Remedios Varo Uranga was born in 1908 in Anglès, a small town in the province of Girona (Catalonia), in northeastern Spain. 

Varo's mother, Ignacia Uranga Bergareche, had been born to Basque parents in Argentina; she was a devout Roman Catholic. Her mother named her newborn in honor of the patron saint of Anglès, Virgen de los Remedios (the "Virgin of Remedies"), after a recently deceased older sister. Varo would have two surviving siblings: an older brother Rodrigo, and another brother Luis. She was the only girl, and the youngest of the three siblings.

Varo's father, Rodrigo Varo y Zajalvo (Cejalvo), was a hydraulic engineer. Because of his work, the family moved to different locations across Spain and North Africa. Varo's father recognized her artistic talents early on and would have her copy the technical drawings of his work with their straight lines, radii, and perspectives, which she reproduced meticulously. He encouraged independent thought and supplemented her education with science and adventure books, notably the novels of Alexandre Dumas, Jules Verne, and Edgar Allan Poe. As she grew older, he provided her with texts on mysticism and philosophy. Those first few years of her life left an impression on Varo that would later show up as motifs in her work such as machinery, furnishings, and artifacts. Romanesque and Gothic architecture, unique to Anglès, also showed up in her later artistic production. 

Varo was given the basic education at a convent school that was typical for young ladies of a good upbringing at the time – but this experience fostered her rebellious tendencies. Varo took a critical view of religion, rejecting the religious ideology of her childhood education, and instead hewed to the liberal and universalist ideas that her father instilled in her. Varo drew throughout her childhood and painted her first painting at age twelve.

The very first works of Varo's - a self-portrait and several portraits of family members - date to 1923, when she was studying for a baccalaureate at the School of Arts and Crafts.

In 1924, aged 15, she enrolled at the Escuela de Bellas Artes in Madrid, under the tutelage of Manuel Benedito. This school emphasized traditional academic study, including painstaking development of technical artistic skills. Many renowned artists were alumni, including Salvador Dalí (though he was expelled for insubordination). Varo was awarded her diploma as a drawing teacher in 1930. 

Varo also exhibited in a collective exhibition organized by the Unión de Dibujantes de Madrid. Surrealistic elements were already apparent in her work at school, at the same time that French surrealism was having an early influence on Spanish surrealism; she also took an early interest in French surrealism. While in Madrid, Varo had her initial introduction to surrealism through lectures, exhibitions, films, and theater. She was a regular visitor to the Prado Museum and took particular interest in the paintings of Hieronymus Bosch, most notably The Garden of Earthly Delights, as well as other artists, such as Francisco de Goya.

The work that Varo created from 1926 to 1935 solidified her career as an artist, but was not seen by the public.

Spain and France (1930-1941)
Varo met her first husband Gerardo Lizárraga at the Escuela de Bellas Artes, and married him in San Sebastián in 1930. This marriage allowed her to flee her hometown and exercise her independence. The couple left Spain for Paris to be nearer to where much of Europe's art scene was. 

After a year, Lizárraga got a job in Spain and the couple moved to Barcelona, at that time a European center of the artistic avant-garde. Both Lizárraga and Varo worked for the J. Walter Thompson advertising company. In 1935, Varo participated in a drawing exhibition in Madrid, which displayed her Composición (Composition).

As a young woman Varo had no doubts that she was meant to be an artist. After spending a year in Paris, Varo moved to Barcelona and formed her first artistic circle of friends, which included Josep-Lluis Florit, Óscar Domínguez, and Esteban Francés. Varo soon separated from her husband and shared a studio with Francés in a neighborhood filled with young avant-garde artists. The summer of 1935 marked Varo's formal invitation into Surrealism when French surrealist  arrived in Barcelona. That same year, along with Jean and his artist friends, Dominguez and Francés, Varo took part in various surrealist games such as cadavres exquis ("exquisite corpses") that were meant to explore the subconscious association of participants by pairing different images at random. These cadavres exquis perfectly illustrated the principles André Breton wrote of in his Surrealist manifestos. Varo soon joined a collective of artists and writers, called the Grupo Logicofobista, who had an interest in Surrealism and wanted to unite art together with metaphysics, while resisting logic and reason. Varo exhibited with this group in 1936 at the Galería Catalonia although she recognized they were not pure Surrealists.

It was through the poet Benjamin Péret that Remedios Varo met André Breton and the Surrealist circle, which included Leonora Carrington, Dora Maar, Roberto Matta, Wolfgang Paalen, and Max Ernst among others. Shortly after arriving in France, Varo took part in the International Surrealist exhibitions in Paris and in Amsterdam in 1938. She drew vignettes for the Dictionnaire abregé du surrealisme; the magazines Trajectoire du Rêve, Visage du Monde, and Minotaure featured her work. In late 1938, she participated in a collaborative series, Jeu de dessin communiqué (Game of Communicated Drawing), of works with Breton and Péret. The series was much like a game, which began with an initial drawing, which was shown to someone for 3 seconds, after which that person tried to recreate what they had been shown. The cycle continued with the showing of their drawing to the next person, and so on. Apparently, this led to very interesting psychological implications that Varo later used in her paintings many times.

Compared to her later time in Mexico, she produced very little work while working in Paris. This may have been due to her status as a femme enfant and the way women were never taken seriously as surrealist artists. She said, reflecting on her time in Paris, "Yes, I attended those meetings where they talked a lot and one learned various things; sometimes I participated with works in their exhibitions; I was not old enough nor did I have the aplomb to face up to them, to a Paul Éluard, a Benjamin Péret, or an André Breton. I was with an open mouth within this group of brilliant and gifted people. I was together with them because I felt a certain affinity. Today I do not belong to any group; I paint what occurs to me and that is all."

In 1937, Varo met political activist and artist Esteban Francés, and left her first husband behind to flee the Spanish Civil War. She moved back to Paris with both Francés and the poet Benjamin Péret in order to escape from the political unrest and fighting, and shared a studio with them there. Varo never divorced Lizárraga and had different partners/lovers throughout her life; but she also remained friends with all of them, in particular with her husband Lizárraga and Péret. By 1939, victorious Francisco Franco forces had banned leftist exiles from returning to Spain.

In Paris, Varo lived in poverty, working odd jobs and having to copy and even to forge paintings in order to get by. After World War II began, Péret was imprisoned in 1940 by the French government for his political beliefs; Varo was also imprisoned as his romantic partner. A few days after Varo was freed, the Germans seized Paris, and she was forced to join other refugees leaving the city. Péret was freed soon after, and the two escaped south to Marseilles. On 20 November 1941 Varo, along with Péret and Rubinstein, boarded the Serpa Pinto in Marseilles to flee Nazi-dominated Europe. The terror she experienced at this time remained as a significant psychological scar.

Mexico (1942-1963)

Varo initially considered her time in Mexico to be temporary. However, except for a year spent in Venezuela, she would reside in Mexico for the rest of her life, producing around 110 paintings during her last decade. 

She said about working in Mexico, "[In Europe] for me it was impossible to paint among such anxiety. In this country I have found the tranquility that I have always searched for". 

In Mexico, she met regularly with other European artists such as Gunther Gerzso, Kati Horna, José Horna, and Wolfgang Paalen. In Mexico, she met native artists such as Frida Kahlo and Diego Rivera, but her strongest ties were to other exiles and expatriates, notably the English painter Leonora Carrington and the French pilot and adventurer, Jean Nicolle. However, because Mexican muralism still dominated the country's art scene, surrealism was not generally well received. She worked as an assistant to Marc Chagall with the design of the costumes for the production of the ballet Aleko, which premiered in Mexico City in 1942.

Varo discovered an interest in the esoteric doctrine of G.I. Gurdjieff in 1943, and officially joined the group in 1944.

She worked at other jobs, including in publicity for the pharmaceutical company Bayer, and decorating for Clar Decor.  In 1947, Péret returned to Paris, and Varo traveled to Venezuela. The trip to Venezuela was part of a French scientific expedition which she joined in Paris during a visit there from Mexico.

Varo returned to Mexico in 1949 and began her third and last important relationship, with Austrian political refugee Walter Gruen, who had endured concentration camps before escaping from Europe. Gruen believed fiercely in Varo, and he gave her the economic and emotional support that allowed her to fully concentrate on her painting. In 1952, Varo married Gruen. His financial stability allowed Varo to stop working as a commercial illustrator, with more time to devote to her painting. The bulk of Varo's significant artwork was produced during 1953-1963.

In 1955, Varo opened her first solo exhibition at the Galería Diana in Mexico City, which was well received. One reason for this was that Mexico had opened up to other artistic trends. Buyers were put on waiting lists for her work. Even the established Mexican artist Diego Rivera was supportive. Her second showing was at the Salón de la Arte de Mujer in 1958. In 1960, her representative, Juan Martín, opened his own gallery and showed her work there, and he opened a second in 1962, at the height of her career. 

In 1963, Varo suddenly died of a heart attack; she had been a heavy smoker. André Breton commented that the death made her "the sorceress who left too soon".

Artistic influences
Renaissance art inspired harmony, tonal nuances, and narrative structure in Varo's paintings. The allegorical nature of much of Varo's work especially recalls the paintings of Hieronymus Bosch, and some critics, such as Dean Swinford, have described her art as "postmodern allegory", much in the tradition of Irrealism.

Varo was influenced by styles as diverse as those of Francisco Goya, El Greco, Picasso, and Braque. While André Breton was a formative influence in her understanding of Surrealism, some of her paintings bear an uncanny resemblance to the Surrealist creations of her contemporary, the Greek-born Italian painter Giorgio de Chirico. Her paintings reflected the painstaking precision drawing skills which she had learned early in life.

While there is little overt influence of Mexican art on her work, Varo and the other surrealists were captivated by the seemingly porous borders between the marvelous and the real in Mexico.

Philosophical influences
Varo considered surrealism as an "expressive resting place within the limits of Cubism, and as a way of communicating the incommunicable".

Even though Varo was critical of her childhood religion, Catholicism, her work was influenced by religion. She differed from other Surrealists because of her constant use of religion in her work. She also turned to a wide range of mystic and hermetic traditions, both Western and non-Western, for influence. She was influenced by her belief in magic and animistic faiths. She was very connected to nature and believed that there was strong relation between the plant, human, animal, and mechanical world. Her belief in mystical forces greatly influenced her paintings. Varo was aware of the importance of biology, chemistry, physics, and botany, and thought it should blend together with other aspects of life. Her fascination with science, including Einstein's theory of relativity and Darwinian evolution, has been noted by admirers of her art.

She turned with equal interest to the ideas of Carl Jung as to the theories of George Gurdjieff, P. D. Ouspensky, Helena Blavatsky, Meister Eckhart, and the Sufis, and was as fascinated with the legend of the Holy Grail as with sacred geometry, witchcraft, alchemy, and the I Ching. Varo described her beliefs about her own powers of witchcraft in a letter to English author Gerald Gardner, "Personally, I don’t believe I’m endowed with any special powers, but instead with an ability to see relationships of cause and effect quickly, and this beyond the ordinary limits of common logic." In 1938 and 1939, Varo joined her closest companions Frances, Roberto Matta, and Gordon Onslow Ford in exploring the fourth dimension, basing much of their studies off of Ouspensky's book Tertium Organum. The books Illustrated Anthology of Sorcery, Magic and Alchemy by Grillot de Givry and The History of Magic and the Occult by Kurt Seligmann were highly valued in Breton's Surrealist circle. She saw in each of these an avenue to self-knowledge and the transformation of consciousness.

She was also greatly influenced by her childhood journeys. She often depicted out-of-the-ordinary vehicles in mystifying lands. These works echo her family travels in her childhood.

Surrealist influences
One critic states, "Remedios seems to never limit herself to one mode of expression. For her tools of the painter and the writer are unified in breaking down our visual and intellectual customs". Even so, most classify her as a surrealist artist in that her work displays many trappings of the surrealist practice. Her work displays a liberating self-image and evokes a sense of otherworldliness which is so characteristic of the surrealist movement. One scholar notes that Varo's practice of automatic writing directly correlates to that of the Surrealists. The father of Surrealism, André Breton, excluded women as fundamental to the movement of Surrealism, but after Varo’s death in 1963, he connected her “forever to the ranks of international surrealism".

The Surrealist movement tended to devalue women. Some of Varo's art elevated women, while still falling under the category of Surrealism. But it was not necessarily her intention for her work to address problems in gender inequality. But her art and actions challenged the traditional patriarchy, and it was mainly Wolfgang Paalen who encouraged her in this with his theories about the origins of civilization in matriarchal cultures, and the analogies between pre-classic Europe and pre-Mayan Mexico.

Relationship with Leonora Carrington and Kati Horna
Among all the refugees that were forced to flee from Europe to Mexico City during and after World War II, Remedios Varo, Leonora Carrington, and Kati Horna formed a bond that would immensely affect their lives and work. They all lived in proximity to each other in the Colonia Roma district of Mexico City.

Varo and Carrington had previously met through André Breton while living in Paris. Although Horna did not meet the other two until they were all in Mexico City, she was already familiar with the work of Varo and Carrington after being given a few of their paintings by Edward James, a British poet and patron of the surrealist movement.

All three attended the meetings of followers of the Russian mystics Peter Ouspensky and George Gurdjieff. They were inspired by Gurdjieff's study of the evolution of consciousness and Ouspensky's idea of the possibility of four-dimensional painting. Though deeply influenced by the ideas of the Russian mystics, the women often ridiculed the practices and behavior of those in the circle. The trio were sometimes referred to as "the three witches", because of their interest in the occult and spiritual practices.

After becoming friends, Varo and Carrington began writing collaboratively and wrote two unpublished plays together: El santo cuerpo grasoso and Lady Milagra - the latter unfinished. Using a technique similar to that of the game called Cadavre Exquis, they took turns writing small segments of text and put them together. Even when not writing together, they were often working collaboratively, often drawing from the same sources of inspiration and using the same themes in their paintings. Despite the fact that their work was extremely similar, there was one major difference: Varo's painting was about line and form, while Carrington's work was about tone and color. Varo and Carrington would remain extremely close friends for 20 years, until Varo's death in 1963.

Interpretations of Varo's artwork
Varo often painted images of women in confined spaces, achieving a sense of isolation.  While Varo did not deem her own work feminist, "her work stretches the limits of and directly challenges confabulated, patriarchal ideals of femininity". Also, Varo's work redacts male interpretation of the female body. Her works focus on female empowerment and agency. The androgynous figures characteristic of her later work also challenge gender in that the figures do not fall neatly into gender normative categories, and often could be of either sex, creating a sense of the "middle area" between the two sexes and of the gender norms placed on them. One critic states, "Because the female body, a sacred erotic artistic space for men, is transformed by [Varo] into nongendered shapes and forms, namely animals and insects, the space becomes freed from monolithic sexual interpretation".  

Later in her career, her characters developed into her emblematic androgynous figures with heart-shaped faces, large almond eyes, and the aquiline noses that represent her own features. Varo often depicted herself through these key features in her paintings, regardless of the figure's gender.  "Varo tends to not play out personal strife on the canvas but rather portrays herself in various roles in surreal dreamscapes". "It is Varo herself who is the alchemist or explorer. In creating these characters, she is defining her identity".

Varo's work also focuses on psychoanalysis and its role in society and female agency. In speaking on Woman leaving the Psychoanalyst (1961), one of Varo's biographers states, "Not only does Varo debunk the idea of a correct process of mental healing, but also she trivializes the very nature of that process by representing the impossible: a physical and literal dismissal of the father, Order, and in Lacanian terms the official entrance into culture: verbal Language".

Legacy

Varo's artwork is well known in Mexico, but is not as well known throughout the rest of the world.

Her mature paintings, fraught with arguably feminist meaning, are predominantly from the last few years of her life. Varo's partner for the last 15 years of her life, Walter Gruen, dedicated his life to cataloguing her work and ensuring her legacy. The paintings of androgynous characters that share Varo's facial features, mythical creatures, the misty swirls, and eerie distortions of perspective are characteristic of Varo's unique strain of surrealism. Varo has painted images of isolated, androgynous, auto-biographical figures to highlight the captivity of the true woman. 

While her paintings have been interpreted as more surrealist canvases that are the product of her passion for mysticism and alchemy, or as auto-biographical narratives, her work carries implications far more significant.

In 1971 the posthumous retrospective exhibition organised by the Museum of Modern Art in Mexico City, drew the largest audiences in its history — larger than those for Diego Rivera and José Clemente Orozco.

More than fifty of her works were displayed in a retrospective exhibition in 2000 at the National Museum of Women in the Arts in Washington, DC.

The Crying of Lot 49, a novella by Thomas Pynchon, features a scene in which the main character recalls crying in front of a painting by Varo titled Bordando el Manto Terrestre ("Embroidering the Earth's Mantle").

Varo's painting The Lovers served as inspiration for some of the images used by Madonna in the music video for her 1995 single "Bedtime Story".

On 22 May 2019 Varo's 1955 painting Simpatía (La rabia del gato) ("Sympathy: the madness of the cat") sold for $3.1 million at an auction at Christie's, New York City.

Selected list of works
 1935 El tejido de los sueños (Fabric of Dreams)
 1937  El Deseo (Le Désil)
 1942 Gruta mágica (Magical Grotto)
 1947 Paludismo (wrongly known as Libélula) (Malaria (anopheles mosquito, Anopheles gambiae))
 1947 El hombre de la guadaña (muerte en el mercado) (The Man with the scythe (death in the market))
 1947 La batalla (The Battle)
 1947 Wahgwah 1947 Amibiasis o los vegetales (Amebiasis or Plants)
 1948 Allegory of Winter 1955 Useless Science or the Alchemist 1955 Ermitaño meditando (Meditating Hermit)
 1955 La revelación o el relojero 1955 Trasmundo (Transworld)
 1955 The Lovers 1955 El flautista (The Piper)
 1955 Solar Music 1956 El paraíso de los gatos (Paradise of cats)
 1956 To the Happiness of Women
 1956 Les feuilles mortes (Dead Leaves)
 1956 Harmony'''
 1956 The Juggler (The Musician) 1957 Creation of the Birds 1957 Women’s Tailor 1957 Caminos tortuosos (Winding Roads)
 1957 Reflejo lunar (Moon Reflection)
 1957 El gato helecho (Fern Cat)
 1958 Celestial Pabulum 1959 Exploration of the Sources of the Orinoco River
 1959 Catedral vegetal (Vegetal cathedral)
 1959 Encounter
 1959 Unexpected Presence
 1960 Hacia la torre (Towards the Tower)
 1960 Mimesis
 1960 Woman Leaving the Psychoanalyst's Office'''
 1960 Visit to the Plastic Surgeon’s 1961 Vampiro (Vampire)
 1961 Embroidering the Earth’s Mantle 1961 Hacia Acuario (Towards Aquarius)
 1962 Vampiros vegetarianos (Vegetarian vampires) - sold for $3,301,000 in May 2015
 1962 Fenómeno (Phenomenon)
 1962 Spiral Transit 1963 Naturaleza muerta resucitando (Still Life Resurrecting)
 1963 Still Life Reviving'See also
 Leonora Carrington
 Kati Horna
 Eva Sulzer
 Esteban Francés
 Gerardo Lizarraga
 Wolfgang Paalen
 Women Surrealists
 Maruja Mallo

References

Further reading
 Angier, Natalie. "Scientific Epiphanies Celebrated on Canvas". The New York Times, 11 Apr. 2000, www.nytimes.com/2000/04/11/science/scientific-epiphanies-celebrated-on-canvas.html
 Arias-Jirasek, Rita, ed. (2008). Women Artists of Modern Mexico: Mujeres artistas en el México de la modernidad /Frida’s Contemporaries:Las contemporáneas de Frida (in English and Spanish). Alejandro G. Nieto, Christina Carlos and Veronica Mercado. Chicago/ Mexico City: National Museum of Mexican Art /Museo Mural Diego Rivera. .
 
 Berland, Rosa J. H. Remedios Varo: The Spanish Work. New Perspectives on the Spanish Avant-garde (1918–1936), Rodopi, Amsterdam, 2015
 Hayne, Deborah J. "The Art of Remedios Varo: Issues of Gender Ambiguity and Religious Meaning." Woman's Art Journal, Vol. 16, No. 1 (Spring - Summer, 1995), pp. 26–32. Woman's Art Inc. (Accessed 10.2307/1358627). https://www.jstor.org/stable/1358627.
 
 
 Kaplan, Janet A. Unexpected Journeys: The Art and Life of Remedios Varo  (New York: Abbeville, 1988), p. 164.
 O’Rawe, Ricki. 'Ruedas metafísicas: "Personality" and "Essence" in Remedios Varo's Paintings'. Hispanic Research Journal. 15.5 (2014): 445–62. https://dx.doi.org/10.1179/1468273714Z.000000000100
 O'Rawe, R. & Quance, R.A., (2016). Crossing the Threshold: Mysticism, Liminality, and Remedios Varo's Bordando el manto terrestre (1961–62). Modern Languages Open. DOI: http://doi.org/10.3828/mlo.v0i0.138
 de Orellana, Margarita ed. Five Keys to the Secret World of Remedios Varo. México City: Artes de México, 2008.
 Ovalle, Ricardo et al. (1994). Remedios Varo: Catálogo Razonado = Catalogue Raisonné.  Ediciones Era, 342 pp. .
 Varo, Remedios. Letters, Dreams & Other Writings''. Trans. Margaret Carson. Cambridge, MA: Wakefield Press, 2018.

External links

 New to MoMA: Remedios Varo's "The Juggler"
 Remedios Varo on Wikiart.org
 Biography
 Remedios Varo Bibliography
 Remedios Varo: Major Works
 Remedios Varo—A Compendium of Online Galleries, Biographies, Articles, and Miscellany
 Chronology of Remedios Varo
 Comprehensive Gallery of paintings by Remedios Varo (Language: Spanish) 
 Association des amis de Benjamin Péret (Language: French)
 National Museum of Women in the Arts, Remedios Varo Artist Profile
 Remedios Varo, 3rd part, English at mujeresartistasfemaleartists
 Remedios Varo 
 Remedios Varo rubricó el surrealismo mexicano mediante ciencia, misticismo, magia y esoterismo

1908 births
1963 deaths
20th-century Mexican painters
20th-century Spanish painters
20th-century Spanish women artists
Catalan speculative fiction artists
Women artists from Catalonia
Mexican speculative fiction artists
Mexican women artists
Naturalized citizens of Mexico
Sacred geometry
Spanish emigrants to Mexico
Spanish surrealist artists
Mexican surrealist artists
Women surrealist artists
Spanish expatriates in France